Lincoln Southwest High School is a Lincoln Public high school which is located on 74 acres adjacent to Wilderness Park in Lincoln, Nebraska.

Academics 

Southwest offers dual enrollment education through three local tertiary education institutions. The University of Nebraska-Lincoln offers dual enrollment to students on the university's campus, Nebraska Wesleyan University (NWU) offers dual enrollment at Southwest's campus through the NWU Honors Academy, and Southeast Community College (SCC) offers dual enrollment on both Southwest's campus and the Lincoln Public School's Career Academy campus located on the SCC campus.

Extracurricular Activities

NSAA Sponsored Programs

Forensics
In 2006, Southwest was awarded the National Speech and Debate Association's National School of Excellence Award for their debate program. In 2013, Southwest's speech program also received the National School of Excellence Award.

Swim and Dive 
The Southwest Girls swim and dive team has won four state championships, including a three-peat from 2016 to 2018. The Silver Hawk first swimming and diving championship was in 2014, which was also the first swim and dive championship for a Lincoln school since 1999. In 2017 the girls' swimming and diving team took first at state and set five new individual state records.

Science Olympiad
The Southwest Science Olympiad team has, since 2008, won ten out of eleven state championships, each annually qualifying them for the national tournament.

Football 
After going win-less in their first season, the Southwest football team has made the state playoffs the last fourteen of the school's sixteen seasons.

Golf 
The Southwest golf teams have won five combined team state title for the school, including a four-year run where the Boys team won three championships. In 2018, the Girls golf team won state championship in the first round of competition, finishing with a seventeen stroke lead.

Music 
The Southwest Music program consists of three primary divisions; band, orchestra, and choir. Nearly a quarter of Southwest's student body is involved in the Music Department, colloquially known as "E-Wingers," due to a majority of the Music Department being located in the school's "E" wing.

Show Choir 
Southwest offers three show choir ensembles: Resonance, their varsity competition ensemble, Ambience, their junior varsity competition ensemble, and most recently, Emergence, their non-audition festival ensemble.  Along with their show band, Echo, they compete at several Midwestern competitions, including the UNL Midwest Cup, Lincoln East Spartan Spectacular, and occasionally travel to other states, like Iowa and Chicago.

Softball 
The Southwest softball team have won three state titles, including back-to-back championships in 2008 and 2009. In 2018, the Silver Hawks was first team in Nebraska to lose their first game in the double-elimination tournament to come back and win a state title.

Tennis 
The Southwest tennis teams have won a combined three state championships. During the 2017 Boys State Finals, Southwest swept the entire championship bracket, winning both singles and both doubles bracket.

Track and Field 
The Southwest Girls track and field teams have won three state titles. The Boys' team placed second in the NSAA state meet in 2017 by half a point to Lincoln High School.

Theatre 
Silver Hawk Theatre is a member of the International Thespian Society and has performed at the International Thespian Festival four times, most recently showcasing Kinky Boots at the 2022 festival in Indiana.

Notable alumni
 Ashley Graham, supermodel and body activist
 Brandon Reilly, NFL football player for the Pittsburgh Steelers

References

External links

 LSW homepage

Public high schools in Nebraska
Schools in Lincoln, Nebraska
Educational institutions established in 2002
2002 establishments in Nebraska